Kensington is a suburb of Timaru, in the South Canterbury area and Canterbury region of New Zealand's South Island. It is located south of the town centre.

Demographics

Kensington had a population of 1,464 at the 2018 New Zealand census, an increase of 48 people (3.4%) since the 2013 census, and an increase of 21 people (1.5%) since the 2006 census. There were 642 households. There were 741 males and 726 females, giving a sex ratio of 1.02 males per female. The median age was 39.2 years (compared with 37.4 years nationally), with 249 people (17.0%) aged under 15 years, 318 (21.7%) aged 15 to 29, 648 (44.3%) aged 30 to 64, and 252 (17.2%) aged 65 or older.

Ethnicities were 88.9% European/Pākehā, 11.5% Māori, 3.3% Pacific peoples, 4.7% Asian, and 1.6% other ethnicities (totals add to more than 100% since people could identify with multiple ethnicities).

The proportion of people born overseas was 11.3%, compared with 27.1% nationally.

Although some people objected to giving their religion, 53.3% had no religion, 33.8% were Christian, 1.2% were Hindu, 0.2% were Muslim, 0.6% were Buddhist and 2.0% had other religions.

Of those at least 15 years old, 102 (8.4%) people had a bachelor or higher degree, and 345 (28.4%) people had no formal qualifications. The median income was $27,900, compared with $31,800 nationally. 102 people (8.4%) earned over $70,000 compared to 17.2% nationally. The employment status of those at least 15 was that 618 (50.9%) people were employed full-time, 180 (14.8%) were part-time, and 33 (2.7%) were unemployed.

References

Suburbs of Timaru
Populated places in Canterbury, New Zealand